Martha Ellen Scott (September 22, 1912 – May 28, 2003) was an American actress. She was featured in major films such as Cecil B. DeMille's The Ten Commandments (1956), and William Wyler's Ben-Hur (1959), playing the mother of Charlton Heston's character in both films. She originated the role of Emily Webb in Thornton Wilder's Our Town on Broadway in 1938 and later recreated the role in the 1940 film version, for which she was nominated for the Academy Award for Best Actress.

Early life
Scott was born in Jamesport, Missouri, the daughter of Letha (née McKinley) and Walter Alva Scott, an engineer and garage owner. Her mother was a second cousin of U.S. President William McKinley. The Scott family remained in Jamesport until Martha was 13 years old, when they moved to Kansas City, Missouri, and eventually to Detroit, Michigan. Scott became interested in acting in high school, an interest she furthered by attending the University of Michigan, earning a teaching certificate and a bachelor of arts degree in drama in 1934.

Career

Stage

Scott received a career boost right out of college, when she appeared with the Globe Theatre Troupe in a series of Shakespeare productions at the Century of Progress world's fair in Chicago in 1934. Following that, she moved to New York City, where she found steady work both in stock stage productions and radio dramas. In 1938, she made her Broadway debut in the original staging of Thornton Wilder's play Our Town as Emily Webb, the tragic young woman who dies in childbirth.

Film

Two years later, Scott reprised the role of Emily in her film debut when Our Town was made into a movie. Her critically acclaimed performance earned her an Academy Award nomination for Best Actress.

Scott found steady movie work for the next four decades, appearing in major epics such as The Ten Commandments, Ben-Hur, The Desperate Hours, and Airport 1975. Charlton Heston was a frequent co-star with Scott on both stage and screen. As she told an interviewer in 1988, "I played his mother twice and his wife twice. I was his mother in Ben Hur and The Ten Commandments. I was his wife on the stage in New York in Design for a Stained Glass Window and The Tumbler in London."

Producer

In 1968, Scott joined Henry Fonda and Robert Ryan in forming a theatrical production company called the Plumstead Playhouse. It later became the Plumstead Theatre Company and moved to Los Angeles. The company produced First Monday in October, both on stage and on film. Scott co-produced both versions. Her last production was Twelve Angry Men, which was performed at the Henry Fonda Theatre in Hollywood, California.

Television

Scott began appearing in TV roles in the medium's early days. On November 2, 1950, she starred in "The Cut Glass Bowl" on The Nash Airflyte Theater, followed by several guest appearances on Robert Montgomery Presents and other shows of television's "golden age", including two episodes of Alfred Hitchcock Presents. This pattern of guest roles continued through the 1960s with appearances on Route 66, Ironside, and The Courtship of Eddie's Father, among others. In the mid-1950s, Scott was the narrator for Modern Romances, an afternoon program on NBC-TV.

Scott was also a frequent TV guest star in the 1970s. She had recurring roles as Bob Newhart's mother on The Bob Newhart Show, the mother of Colonel Steve Austin (Lee Majors) on both The Six Million Dollar Man and The Bionic Woman, as well as Patricia Shepard, Sue Ellen and Kristin's mother on Dallas during its early years and later during the 1986 season.  Scott was cast in single-episode guest appearances on several hit shows of the era, such as The Sandy Duncan Show, Columbo: Playback (1975), The Mod Squad, Marcus Welby, M.D., and The Love Boat. She played the role of Jennifer Talbot, Terri Brock's nasty grandmother, on General Hospital for six months (1986–1987), which ended when her character was murdered and stuffed in a drain pipe.

In the 1980s, she had a regular role on the short-lived series Secrets of Midland Heights and appeared in several television movies and in single episodes of shows such as Magnum, P.I., The Paper Chase, and Highway to Heaven. In the late 1980 she costarred with Jeffrey Lynn in an episode of Murder, She Wrote, which was a direct sequel to their 1949 feature film Strange Bargain. Scott's final acting role on television was in 1990 in the movie Daughter of the Streets.

Personal life

Scott was married twice, first to radio producer and announcer Carleton William Alsop from 1940 to 1946, and then to jazz pianist and composer Mel Powell from 1946 until his death in 1998. She had one child with Alsop, son Carleton Scott Alsop, and two daughters—Mary Powell Harpel and Kathleen Powell—with her second husband. 

According to her son, Scott never forgot about her childhood hometown, using the mental image of a Jamesport cemetery in preparation for her Oscar-nominated role in Our Town. Said Alsop, "She told me she used that place as her image because it's so serene and beautiful" and that her deceased McKinley and Scott relatives "became the Gibbs and the Webbs in the play".

A Democrat, she supported the campaign of Adlai Stevenson during the 1952 presidential election.

Scott died on May 28, 2003, in Van Nuys, Los Angeles, aged 90, from natural causes. She was interred next to Powell in the Masonic Cemetery in her native Jamesport, Missouri.

Honors
For her contribution in the theatre, Scott has a star on the Hollywood Walk of Fame at 6126 Hollywood Boulevard.

Partial filmography

Our Town (1940) – Emily Webb
The Howards of Virginia (1940) – Jane Peyton-Howard
Cheers for Miss Bishop (1941) – Ella Bishop
They Dare Not Love (1941) – Marta Keller
One Foot in Heaven (1941) – Hope Morris Spence
Stage Door Canteen (1943) – Martha Scott
Hi Diddle Diddle (1943) – Janie Prescott Phyffe
In Old Oklahoma (1943) – Catherine Elizabeth Allen
So Well Remembered (1947) – Olivia
Strange Bargain (1949) – Georgia Wilson
When I Grow Up (1951) – Mother Reed (1890s)
The Desperate Hours (1955) – Ellie Hilliard
The Ten Commandments (1956) – Yochabel
Eighteen and Anxious (1957) – Lottie Graham
Sayonara (1957) – Mrs. Webster
Ben-Hur (1959) – Miriam
The Devil's Daughter (1973, TV movie) – Mrs. Stone
Charlotte's Web (1973) – Mrs. Arable (voice) (age 60)
The Man from Independence (1974) – Mamma Truman
Thursday's Game (1974, TV Movie) – Mrs. Reynolds
Airport 1975 (1974) – Sister Beatrice
The Bob Newhart Show (1975) - "Fathers and Sons and Mothers" as Bob's mother Martha Hartley
The Turning Point (1977) – Adelaide
The Word (1978, TV Movie) - Sarah Randall
First Monday in October (1981) – Cameo Appearance (uncredited)
Summer Girl (1983, TV movie) - Martina Shelburne 
Adam (1983, TV Movie) – Gram Walsh
Magnum P.I. (1983, TV series; Season 4, Episode 68, Limited Engagement) - Jeanie LaSalle
Doin' Time on Planet Earth (1988) – Virginia Camalier
Daughter of the Streets (1990, TV Movie) - Sarah

Radio appearances

References

External links

1912 births
2003 deaths
20th-century American actresses
Actresses from Missouri
American film actresses
American radio actresses
American stage actresses
American television actresses
People from Daviess County, Missouri
University of Michigan School of Music, Theatre & Dance alumni
Missouri Democrats
California Democrats
21st-century American women